The modern constellation Crux is not included in the Three Enclosures and Twenty-Eight Mansions system of traditional Chinese uranography because its stars are too far south for observers in China to know about them prior to the introduction of Western star charts. Based on the work of Xu Guangqi and the German Jesuit missionary Johann Adam Schall von Bell in the late Ming Dynasty, this constellation has been classified as one of the 23 Southern Asterisms (近南極星區, jìn nán jí xīng qū) under the name Cross (十字架, shí zì jià).

Possibly Acrux (Alpha Crucis), Mimosa (Beta Crucis) and Gacrux (Gamma Crucis) are bright stars in this constellation that never seen in Chinese sky.

The name of the western constellation in modern Chinese is 南十字座 (nán shí zì zuò), meaning "the southern cross-shaped constellation".

Stars
The map of Chinese constellation in constellation Crux area consists of :

See also
Chinese astronomy
Traditional Chinese star names
Chinese constellations
List of brightest stars

References

External links
Crux – Chinese associations
香港太空館研究資源
中國星區、星官及星名英譯表
天象文學
台灣自然科學博物館天文教育資訊網
中國古天文
中國古代的星象系統

Astronomy in China
Crux (constellation)